The Cape Dory 25D, also called the Cape Dory 25 Mark II and later sold as the Octavia 25, is  an American trailerable sailboat that was designed by Carl Alberg as a cruiser and first built in 1981. The "D" designation indicates that it is equipped with a diesel engine.

The Cape Dory 25D is sometimes confused with the unrelated 1973 design from the same manufacturer, which it replaced in production, the Cape Dory 25.

Production
The design was built by Cape Dory Yachts in East Taunton, Massachusetts, United States from 1981 to 1985, with 189 boats completed. The design was also built around 1996 by C. W. Hood Yachts and sold as the Octavia 25, but it is now out of production.

Design
The Cape Dory 25D was intended to be a replacement boat for the Cape Dory 25 after sales of that model dropped off. The  design goals included a boat with more sail power, capable of being cruised on extended voyages in comfort by two people.

The Cape Dory 25D is a recreational keelboat, built predominantly of fiberglass, with teak wood trim. The deck and cabin roof have a balsa core. It has a masthead sloop rig with a deck stepped mast; a spooned, raked stem; a raised counter, angled transom; a keel-mounted rudder controlled by a tiller and a fixed long keel. It displaces  and carries  of ballast.

The design has sleeping accommodation for four people, with two straight settees in the main cabin, one of which can convert into a double and a quarter berth aft on the starboard side. The "L"-shaped galley is located on the port side just forward of the companionway ladder. The galley is equipped with a two-burner stove and a sink. The head is located in the bow and includes a vanity, wet and dry hanging lockers and a shower that drains into the bilge. The interior has a fully-molded hull liner.

Operational history
The boat is supported by an active class club that organizes racing events, the Cape Dory Sailboat Owners Association.

In a 2010 review Steve Henkel wrote, "best features: In our opinion this boat might come close to the ideal boat for couples who want a cruising boat that can go offshore and has some elbow below, but still can be trailered hither and yon behind a big pickup truck. Worst features: The Cape Dory 25D wins the prize for the highest PHRF among her comp[etitor]s, though sailors who find this boat appealing probably won't do much racing anyway. For steering comfort, the tiller sprouting out of the cockpit sole is not the best."

In a 2000 review in Practical Sailor,  Darrell Nicholson wrote, "the only thing that the 25 and the 25D have in common is overall length. The 25D was an entirely different boat: wider, heavier, deeper, with inboard engine, a dramatically different interior, and a new price tag 50% higher than that of the 25 ... The 25D has the potential to be a comfortable long-term cruiser for a couple, with a roomy interior whose only real flaw is a mediocre galley arrangement ... The 25D is tough enough to be a serious cruising boat, We would not be surprised to hear that someone sails one across the Atlantic, although ocean voyaging in so small a boat is not our personal cup of tea."

See also
List of sailing boat types

Related development
Cape Dory 25

References

External links

Keelboats
1980s sailboat type designs
Sailing yachts
Trailer sailers
Sailboat type designs by Carl Alberg
Sailboat types built by Cape Dory Yachts
Sailboat types built by CW Hood Yachts